Saint Luke is one of Dominica's 10 administrative parishes. It is bordered by St. George (to the north), St. Mark (to the south), and St. Patrick (to the east).

The parish is one of Dominica's smallest in area and population. 1,668 people live in its 7.77 km² (3 mi²) of area. Pointe Michel (La Pointe) is its only settlement.

Its shape resembles a wedge pointing right, with the top part cut off.

References

External links

 
Parishes of Dominica